Stephanie Lang (born December 30, 1988), currently known by her stage name DYLN and previously known professionally as Stef Lang, is a Canadian Pop/RnB artist, songwriter, and producer based in Los Angeles, California. Lang adopted the stage name DYLN in 2016 and independently released her debut single "Better Things", which Pip Williams of The Line of Best Fit describes as "Sharp, slick electro-pop with a hell of an attitude." Lang wrote and co-produced her latest EP, DYLN_02, released in December 2020, which amassed over a million streams, garnering attention from coveted curated playlists such as New Music Friday and Alternative R&B.

The name DYLN comes from a guitar she named Dylan, on which she wrote songs during a depression. The carbon fiber guitar was said to be unbreakable so the singer kept the sentiment as her name. Her musical style includes pop/r&b and influences of hip-hop and electronic sounds. The singer is known for her wide-ranging vocals, her talk-rapping style, and for her messages of female empowerment. She has performed at notable venues in New York such as Rockwood Music Hall, The Bitter End, and Pianos as well as clubs in Los Angeles such as The Peppermint Club, Hotel Cafe, and Resident. She has toured internationally and performed at events such as South by Southwest, NXNE, the Canadian Radio Music Awards, the Toronto International Film Festival, and CMJ.

Early life 
DYLN was born in 1988 in Nanaimo, on Vancouver Island in British Columbia. The divorce of her parents when she was five prompted her to write letters to her mother in an effort to comfort her during the time of separation. DYLN recalls her earliest memories to be a display of heightened arguments between her parents. She credits the divorce as the catalyst that made her a songwriter. "I became hypersensitive and aware of people's emotions early on. I wrote long letters to make sense of everything for myself. I think the trauma of it made me become a writer because it continues to be my natural way of dealing with things."

Career

2006-2010: CAREER BEGINNINGS 

In the spring of 2006, Lang won a local radio station talent competition hosted by The Beat 94.5, now Virgin Radio, where she won a four-song recording deal with a recording studio. After graduating high school at 17, she moved to Vancouver, BC, where accepted a studio internship to learn more about the music industry and music production. She spent this time honing her songwriting skills and learning how to run the studio. She worked part-time at a local grocery store as a check-out clerk while performing at clubs like The Roxy, The Railway Club, The Media Club, The Bourbon, The Main, and The Rusty Gull. She also worked odd jobs as a cashier, retail sales clerk, server, hostess, and as an extra on film sets.

At 18, DYLN suffered from severe depression and anxiety, stopping her ability to write or perform for six months. She continued an abusive relationship, which ended up inspiring songs for her debut album.

Within four years, she had written over 250 songs. Two EPs were released, titled Birth and Blood and Bravery. In the spring of 2009, DYLN signed a publishing deal with Nettwerk One/H-Songs, who launched the careers of Sarah McLachlan and Coldplay and other world-renowned artists such as Shania Twain, Avril Lavigne, Chantal Kreviazuk.
In 2010, she independently released her debut album, The Underdog, which earned her two Canadian Radio Music Award Nominations (HOT AC & CHR) for her single "Mr. Immature". The album was also nominated for Pop Album of the Year at the Western Canadian Music Awards. Two EPs were released, titled Birth and Blood and Bravery.

2010-2016: The Underdog, Fighting Mirrors, Arrows Pt. 1 & 2 

In 2010, Lang toured Canada nationally for her debut album, The Underdog, often performing at clubs and colleges and making various radio station appearances. In 2011, Her follow-up single, "Slave 2 Love", was dubbed the most added song on Canadian Radio that year.
From 2010 to 2013, Lang often traveled to New York, Los Angeles, and Nashville for songwriting trips, while working as a waitress in bars. During that time, she opened for K'naan, Fefe Dobson, Simple Plan, Ron Sexsmith, Matt Good, Shawn Desman, and Sum 41.
In 2012, Lang self-released her EP Fighting Mirrors which garnered Canadian Radio airplay with her single "Paper Doll." Later that year, she independently released a full album called Self, which she wrote and produced entirely herself.
In 2013, Lang moved to New York to further pursue music and ended her management and publishing agreements to remain fully independent. Lang's vocals were featured on ISH's song "Rollin released on Warner Music, which also received airplay on Canadian radio that year.
She continued to focus on writing sessions while living in Bushwick, Brooklyn, and started to perform in clubs such as Rockwood Music Hall and The Bitter End, later releasing her EP Rubix in 2014. By 2015, Lang released two more EPs, Arrows Pt. 1 and Arrows Pt. 2, where she once again wrote and produced all of the tracks. Her final release under the name Stef Lang was her single "Stronger", which she wrote to raise awareness for mental health and wellness in 2016.

2017-2018: Better Things, Hold, Chapter 1: The Truth 

In 2017, Lang made her debut as DYLN with her single "Better Things", which garnered buzz from notable music blogs such as The Line of Best Fit, Hilly Dilly, and Going Solo. Later that year she released two more singles, "Hold" and "Colours". Notable music blog Hillydilly wrote, "You ought to know her new song, 'Better Things'. It’s one pulsating and filled with attitude." It was added to their Songs of the Week playlist.
In 2018, DYLN moved to Los Angeles to further pursue music opportunities and later released her first EP, Chapter 1: The Truth. Mitch Mosk of Atwood Magazine described Chapter 1: The Truth as "A gorgeous three-track collection of dynamic and intimately reflective dark indie pop." Later that year, she performed in Los Angeles venues such as The Peppermint Club and made her debut showcasing at SXSW. As a follow-up to her first EP, she later released another three-song EP called "Chapter 2: The Silver Lining" in 2019.

2019: RINGS 

In 2019, DYLN released a full-length album called Rings, which she wrote and co-produced with her husband Frequency (Eminem, Rihanna), written entirely about their marriage. In a post by Wonky Sensitive, the blog refers to the album as  "A collection of 10 heartfelt and deeply personal songs, Rings is a portrait of marriage - a glimpse of the highs, the lows, and everything in between. Exploring intimacy, communication, resentment, and commitment in a pop/R&B soundscape"

2020: DYLN_02 

Pulling inspiration from Beyonce, Missy Elliot, The Black Eyed Peas, and Run The Jewels, DYLN started crafting a new style incorporating her ability to talk-rap and sing full-range simultaneously. Her most recent EP "DYLN_02," dips into a more moody, female empowerment landscape, exuding confidence, attitude, and swagger. She wrote and co-produced the EP "DYLN_02" with her husband during the pandemic and released it in December 2020 and it was featured on playlists such as New Music Friday and Alternate R&B, amassing over a million streams.

Musical style

The genre of DYLN's music has been described as pop with r&b and electronic undertones, often using hip-hop influences. Her latest EP "DYLN_02" includes her wide-ranging vocals in songs like "Shower" as well as her talk-rapping style in "Quit Talkin’" and showcases influences to the likes of Beyoncé, Missy Elliot and The Black Eyed Peas. About her songwriting process, she says, "My philosophy is to write real songs," often crediting influences like Kid Cudi and Robyn, whose themes of darkness and sadness have molded her music.

DYLN is also a music producer, often producing songs on her own, which is an unusual skill set not often seen. Her musical style remains empowering and arty while standing at the forefront of contemporary mainstream music. Music blog PressPlayOk referred to her music as having "unforgettable style," and later stated, "Proclaiming this NYC gal as a future pop queen. Not to be missed." Notable music blog Hillydilly wrote, "You ought to know her new song, 'Better Things.' It’s one pulsating and filled with attitude." It was added to their Songs of the Week playlist.

Discography

Singles 

Extended plays

Studio Albums

Film & TV song placements

 "Like That"  – Almost Family / Pilot Episode
 "Face The Arrows"  – VH1's Black Ink Crew" / Episode 514
 "Stronger"  – VH1's "Black Ink Crew" / Episode 506
 "Paper Doll" – LA Complex Episode 212
 "Bullet Train" – Degrassi Episode 1217
 "Diamonds" – Degrassi Episode Love Lockdown Part2
 "Straitjacket" – Degrassi Episode in Your Eyes, Season 9 Ep. 18
 "All For You" – Degrassi Episode 1311
 "Overdrive" – Degrassi Episode 1326
 "Vulnerable" – Rookie Blue Episode 11
 "All This Time" – The Best Years
 "You Make Me Wanna Fly" – Delta Airlines
 "Give a Little Bit" – CTV BC "Making a Difference" campaign
 "Going Places" – Beauty and the Beast No. 308

Vocal features

 "Last Chance" – Kaskade – Grammy-nominated album Atmosphere
 "Rollin – Ish (ft. Stef Lang) – Warner Music Group
 "Consciousness of Love" – Delerium – Music Box Opera
 "Chrysalis Heart" – Delerium – Music Box Opera
 "All These Wounds" – Ilan Bluestone & BT (ft. on Anjunabeats Worldwide05)
 "Easy"  –  Duke & Jones

Appearances

 2009 – Canadian Music Cafe during TIFF (Toronto International Film Festival)
 2010 – NXNE (North by Northeast) (Toronto)
 2010 – CMJ (College Music Journal) (New York)
 2011 – Canadian Radio Music Awards (Toronto)
 2011 – Showcase at Canadian Music Week (Toronto)
 2013 – Showcase & CMF Acoustic Session at Canadian Music Week (Toronto)
 2018 - South by Southwest Showcase
 Stef Lang has opened for K'naan, Fefe Dobson, Simple Plan, Ron Sexsmith, Matt Good, Shawn Desman, and Sum 41.

Radio success

 "Mr. Immature" – Hit No. 5 on the Billboard Chart for Canadian Emerging Artist
 "Slave 2 Love" – American Music Chart – CANADA: HOT AC; hit #12 on Mainstream Radio
 "Rollin Ish – 2012 – Canadian Hot 100, peaked at No. 59
 "Paper Doll" – 2012 – No. 1 Most Added Song in Canadian Radio

Awards and nominations

 Canadian Radio Music Awards (CHR) 2011 – nominated
 Canadian Radio Music Awards (HOT AC) 2011 – nominated
 Western Canadian Music Awards (Best Pop Album) 2011 – nominated

References

External links 
Official website

1988 births
Living people
Canadian singer-songwriters
Canadian record producers
Musicians from British Columbia
People from the Cowichan Valley Regional District
21st-century Canadian women singers
Canadian women record producers